Brian Dobie (born February 16, 1953) is a former Canadian football wide receiver and the current head coach for the University of Manitoba's football team, the Manitoba Bisons. Brian became Manitoba's head coach in 1996 after serving as head coach for Churchill High School in Winnipeg for 21 years. His Bisons have appeared in two Vanier Cups, winning in 2007.

Dobie coached long-time NFL player Israel Idonije and many CFL players such as Don Oramasionwu and Brady Browne and former player and the acting CEO of the Winnipeg Blue Bombers Wade Miller .

Dobie is a part-time commentator for CIS and CFL football coverage on TSN.

References

General
https://web.archive.org/web/20121015235525/http://www.gobisons.ca/index.php?page=team_staff&sport=football
https://web.archive.org/web/20121014214542/http://www.umanitoba.ca/faculties/physed/athletics/football/staff.shtml
http://www.winnipegsun.com/2011/08/16/dobies-green-team
https://web.archive.org/web/20121104161039/http://www.chicagobears.com/team/roster/israel-idonije/03a3b42b-c8ed-40cd-a3b4-4870f5311619/

External links

1953 births
Living people
Manitoba Bisons football players
Players of Canadian football from Manitoba
Canadian football people from Winnipeg
Manitoba Bisons football coaches